The Association of Mineworkers and Construction Union (AMCU) was formed in Mpumalanga, South Africa, in 1998 as a breakaway faction of the COSATU-affiliated National Union of Mineworkers (NUM). It was formally registered as a union in 2001. According to Mining Weekly, the union sees itself as distinct from NUM in that it is "apolitical and noncommunist".

Competition with NUM over bargaining rights, especially at the Impala Platinum and Lonmin mines in the Rustenburg area culminated in the violent Marikana miners' strike and what became known as the Marikana Massacre, in which police shot and killed over 30 strikers.

The AMCU now represents over 70% of Lonmin employees, compared to the 20% representation of the NUM. It is also the majority union at Anglo American Platinum (Amplats) and Impala Platinum.

References

See also
 The rise and rise of Amcu, by Jan de Lange, Miningmx, 2 August 2012
 The Marikana action is a strike by the poor against the state and the haves, Justice Malala, The Guardian, 17 August 2012

http://www.labourguide.co.za/general/registered-trade-unions-in-south-africa-561
http://terrybellwrites.com/2012/08/15/no-angels-in-bloody-sa-mine-clashes/

National Council of Trade Unions
Mining trade unions
Trade unions in South Africa
Trade unions established in 1998